Randall Gene Spelling (born October 9, 1978) is an American life coach and former actor. He is the brother of Tori Spelling and the son of Candy and Aaron Spelling.

Early life
Spelling was born in Los Angeles. He has an older sister, actress and reality television personality Tori Spelling. He attended Montclair College Prep.

Career
In 1995 when Spelling was 17 years old, he played the role of Flipper Gage in the teen-oriented drama Malibu Shores, which was produced by his father. Spelling said he took the role because the characterization was completely different from himself.

He also carried out a guest role on the popular series Beverly Hills 90210 alongside his sister Tori Spelling.

Spelling was later cast as Sean Richards in Sunset Beach, again produced by his father.

In 2007, Spelling took part in his own reality television series, Sons of Hollywood, which aired on the A&E Network. He starred alongside Sean Stewart and David Weintraub.

As of 2009, he works as a life coach between Portland, Oregon and West Los Angeles.

Personal life
Spelling married Leah Stutz (now Leah Spelling) on September 25, 2010. The couple have two daughters.

Filmography

Starring roles
Malibu Shores (1996) as 'Flipper' Gage
Sunset Beach (1997–99) as Sean Richards
Sons of Hollywood (2007) as Himself

Selected guest-starring roles
Beverly Hills, 90210 as Ryan Sanders/Kenny (1992–2000: 14 episodes)
7th Heaven as Alex Mandelbaum (2004: one episode)

Movie/mini-series/special roles
Held for Ransom (2000) as Dexter
National Lampoon Presents Dorm Daze (2003) as Foosball
Hoboken Hollow (2005) as Parker Hilton
Hot Tamale (2006) as Harland Woodriff
National Lampoon's Pledge This! (2006) as Kelly
Cosmic Radio (2007) as Marty
Dimples (2008) as Billy

References

External links
Official website
Randy Spelling's Blog

1978 births
Living people
Male actors from Los Angeles
American male film actors
American people of Polish-Jewish descent
American people of Russian-Jewish descent
American male television actors
Jewish American male actors
Participants in American reality television series
Male actors from Beverly Hills, California
Male actors from Portland, Oregon
Life coaches
Spelling family
21st-century American Jews
People from Holmby Hills, Los Angeles
Montclair College Preparatory School alumni